Kao Cheng-hua (born 1 July 1977) is a Taiwanese baseball player who played for Uni-President Lions of Chinese Professional Baseball League. He played as catcher for the Lions.

References

1977 births
Living people
Baseball catchers
People from Hualien County
Taiwanese baseball players
Uni-President Lions players
Uni-President 7-Eleven Lions players
Uni-President 7-Eleven Lions coaches